Mesa Public Schools (incorporated as Mesa Unified School District #4) is the largest public school district in the state of Arizona. Its approximately 64,000 students enjoy opportunities such as Montessori, International Baccalaureate, dual-language immersion, honors and Advanced Placement courses and Franklin traditional schools.

MPS serves most of the city of Mesa, plus small portions of Tempe and Chandler.

The district has 82 schools, which includes 55 elementary schools, 9 junior high schools, six comprehensive high schools, and several alternative schools.

Schools

High schools
High schools (9-12) as listed by Mesa Public Schools:

Junior high schools
Junior high schools (7-8) as listed by Mesa Public Schools:

Mesa Public Schools operated two other junior high schools until 2009-2010 school year.

Hendrix Junior High School consolidated with the adjoining Frost Elementary School as the K-8 Summit Academy with an International Baccalaureate Program. Hendrix had the husky as its mascot and used the colors red and gray.

Powell Junior High School (colors red, white, and blue, mascot the Patriots) closed in May 2010. The former campus serves as the Mesa Educational Center, home to the district's Community Education Department, East Valley Academy and Crossroads.

Mesa Jr High closed at the end of the 2011-2012 school year and was demolished in January 2014 - Post demolition, the site was converted into a community center.

Brimhall Jr High closed at the end of the 2011-2012 school year - converted to Franklin school

Name notes
Fremont — John C. Fremont
Kino — Eusebio Kino
Poston — Charles D. Poston
Shepherd — Rulon T. Shepherd, a 30-year Mesa superintendent who built the first junior high in Mesa
Stapley — Orley. S. Stapley, at one time the largest International Harvester farm equipment dealer in the United States, as well as the owner of the largest mercantile business in Arizona during the 1940s and 1950s; also the namesake of Stapley Drive
Taylor — Harvey L. Taylor

Elementary schools
Elementary schools (K-6) as listed by Mesa Public Schools:

 Adams
 Anne M. Lindbergh
 Benjamin Franklin
 Benjamin Franklin Elementary - West Campus
 Barbara Bush
 Crismon Elementary
 Dilworth Brinton
 Edison
 Eisenhower Center For Innovation
 Entz
 Falcon Hill
 Field
 Franklin at Alma
 Franklin at Brimhall
 Franklin East
 Franklin West
 Pedro Guerrero Elementary
 Hermosa Vista
 Highland Arts
 Holmes
 Hughes 
 Irving
 James Madison
 Jefferson
 John K. Kerr, M. D.
 John Philip Sousa
 Keller
 Las Sendas
 Lehi
 Lincoln
 Longfellow
 Lowell
 MacArthur
 Nathan Hale
 Patterson
 Pedro Guerrero
 Pomeroy
 Porter
 Ralph Waldo Emerson
 Ramón S. Mendoza
 Red Mountain Ranch
 Redbird
 Robson
 Roosevelt
 Salk
 Sandra Day O’Connor
 Sirrine
 Stevenson

 Taft
 Veora E. Johnson
 Washington
 Webster
 Whitman
 Whittier
 Wilson
 Zaharis
 Zedo Ishikawa

Frost Elementary consolidated with the adjoining Hendrix Junior High in 2010-11 to become the K-8 Summit Academy.

Alternative school
Alternative schools (named "Focus Schools" by the district) as listed by Mesa Public Schools:

See also
 Chandler Unified School District
 Gilbert Public Schools
 Tempe Elementary School District
 Tempe Union High School District
 Mesa Distance Learning Program

References

External links
 Mesa Public Schools
Mesa Public Schools Finance
 Arizona Department of Education district report card for 2006-2007

School districts in Maricopa County, Arizona

Education in Tempe, Arizona
School districts established in 1946
1946 establishments in Arizona